Spencer Battiest is an American Indian singer-songwriter, musician, producer, and actor from Hollywood, Florida. In 2013, Spencer became the first American Indian artist to sign with Hard Rock Records. His song "The Storm" garnered his first music video win, followed by his single "Love of My Life."

Growing up on the Hollywood Seminole Indian Reservation in Florida, Battiest's passion came from singing gospel hymns in the Miccosukee and Choctaw languages before turning his sights on Pop/Rock and R&B.

In 2002, at the age of 11, Spencer became the first and youngest Seminole Tribe member to perform the National Anthem on live television for an ESPN NHL hockey game between the Florida Panthers and Chicago Blackhawks. Later, he was invited to sing the National Anthem for national boxing matches on Showtime, HBO, and ESPN2.

From 2007 to 2010, Battiest performed at the annual Calling Festival among such artists as Stevie Wonder, Aerosmith, Bruce Springsteen, Eric Clapton and Neil Young.

In the summer of 2015, Spencer performed at the annual Hard Rock Rising Barcelona Global musical festival, opening for such artists as Robbie Williams, Kings of Leon and Juanes.

Early life
Spencer was born in Plantation, Florida, to June Lena Baker Battiest (Seminole) and Henry Lee Battiest, Jr. (Choctaw). Spencer grew up between Broken Bow, Oklahoma and the Hollywood Seminole Indian Reservation. He graduated from Hollywood Christian School. Spencer has four sisters and two brothers. His older brother, Zachary a.k.a. "Doc," collaborates with him on music.

Spencer's first appearance on stage was when he was 4, when at his grandfather's home church in Broken Bow. His father (who is full-blood Choctaw) came from a long line of gospel singers and taught Spencer to sing hymns in his traditional tribal language. His father saw his son's interest in singing and groomed him as a vocalist. By age 11, Spencer was invited to sing live during the opening NHL game on ESPN between the Florida Panthers and Chicago Blackhawks. After this performance, he was invited to sing the National Anthem for boxing matches on Showtime, HBO, and ESPN2.

While attending a Christian school in Hollywood, Florida, Spencer took part in stage plays and musicals. At 14, Spencer began studying acting, which led to his invitation to audition for IPOP (International Presentation of Performance) among prominent television directors, top talent scouts, and Broadway agents. Spencer was one of the 15 chosen from over a thousand kids invited internationally to participate in the grand finale showcase production. Spencer won the award for "Best Top Male Teen" overall award at IPOP.

Music

Without formal training, Spencer continued to sing and study music independently and, through his songwriting, to find deeper connection with his audience. Spencer's musical influences include Stevie Wonder, Barbra Streisand, and Prince.

From 2007 to 2010, Battiest performed at the annual Calling Festival (formerly Hyde Park Calling and Hard Rock Calling) with Stevie Wonder, Aerosmith, Bruce Springsteen, Eric Clapton, Neil Young, Sting and The Police. He played a compilation of pop/rock music for the audience of more than 100,000 at London's High Park arena.

In 2011, Spencer collaborated with his brother Zachary to write and produce "The Storm," a song about the history of his tribe. Its video was directed by Kiowa/Choctaw filmmaker Steven Paul Judd and a Seminole youth program inviting students to participate in film production. The music video was filmed entirely on the Seminole Reservation in Florida, highlighting historical land, ancestry, and culture. The song is a tribute to the Seminole Tribe of Florida and a homage to Battiest's parents, grandparents, and tribal leaders. The video garnered their first award, for "Best Music Video" at the 36th Annual American Indian Film Festival in San Francisco, California. It was also an official selection at ImagineNATIVE in Toronto, Canada and won an award at the Smithsonian's Santa Fe Native Cinema Showcase. Additionally, it was nominated for three Native American Music Awards (NAMMYs): "Best Rap/Hip Hop Recording," "Debut Artist of the Year" and "Song/Single of the Year." The video continues to receive international recognition.

In 2014, Battiest once again collaborated with Steven Paul Judd to direct his first ever-single with Hard Rock Records, "Love of My Life," which he co-produced with Brandon "B" Howard. The music video was filmed in Hollywood, California and follows a young couple. Following his passion, Battiest involved Native American talent in the video for his song, featuring Dakota/Cree actress Shayna Jackson and Navajo producer Pamela J. Peters. As Spencer highlighted in interviews, his goal is to elevate other natives in the entertainment industry. Love of My Life was nominated for "Best Music Video" at the 39th Annual American Indian Film Festival and was nominated for "Song Single of the Year" and "Best Music Video" at the 2014 Native American Music Awards (NAMMYs). The video won "Best Music Video" at the Native Cinema showcase. The video has been screened at the 3rd San Diego American Indian Film Festival, the 2015 Talking Stick Indigenous Film Festival and the Museum of New Mexico Media Center's Today's movies. "Love of my Life" is also showcased internationally at Hard Rock Café Restaurants.

In April 2015, Spencer and the Osceola Brothers Band performed in Miami, Florida as part of the first Hard Rock Rising concert in the U.S with an audience of over 52,000. The festival also featured Andrea Bocelli, Jon Secada, Gloria Estefan, et al.

In the summer of 2015, Spencer performed at the annual Hard Rock Rising Barcelona Global musical festival, opening for Robbie Williams, Kings of Leon, Juanes, Lenny Kravitz, Avicii and Steve Angello. The weekend-long event took place at the Platja del Forum (Parc de la Pau, s/n. Sant Adria de Besos, Barcelona) on July 24 and 25, 2015. Spencer provided a sneak peek to some of his new music along with compilation songs from The Beatles, Come Together and Darkness I believe in a Thing Called Love.

Battiest released his debut EP entitled Stupid In Love in 2015 with three other original songs entitled: Mary Jane, Right Here, and Over You. In 2019, he collaborated with Melissa B. for the single iTunes release, Permission to Love.

On October 16, 2019, Spencer Battiest and his brother Doc Battiest became the first performers to play at the new Hard Rock Live amphitheater at the Seminole Hard Rock Hotel and Casino in Hollywood, Florida.

Acting
In 2013, Spencer took the lead roles for Native Voices at the Autry's developing plays: Distant Thunder (a Blackfeet musical), The Day We Were Born, and Champ. In 2013, Spencer participated in a multimedia project conducted by Navajo filmmaker Pamela J. Peters project Legacy of Exiled NDNZ which documents young American Indians currently living in Los Angeles, California as a tribute to the first generation of relocated Indian of the 1950s. The project has expanded to a full-documentary entitled Exiled NDNZ. Thus far, the filmmaker has been documenting Spencer's musical career in the past year and will continue to for the next two years.

References

External links 
 Spencer Battiest

21st-century Native Americans
Year of birth missing (living people)
Living people
American singer-songwriters
21st-century American singers
Native American musicians